Yani Pehlivanov (born 14 July 1988) is a Bulgarian footballer who plays as a midfielder for Etar Veliko Tarnovo.

Career
Pehlivanov began his career at Chernomorets Pomorie. In January 2011 he joined Chernomorets Burgas. He made his A PFG debut on 5 May against Montana.

On 16 June 2017, Pehlivanov signed a 1-year contract with Etar.

Career statistics

References

External links
 
 
 Player Profile at Football24
 Player Profile at Sportal.bg

1988 births
Living people
Sportspeople from Burgas
Bulgarian footballers
Association football midfielders
Association football defenders
FC Pomorie players
PFC Chernomorets Burgas players
Neftochimic Burgas players
SFC Etar Veliko Tarnovo players
First Professional Football League (Bulgaria) players